The name HTC Desire has been used for two devices produced by HTC Corporation:

 The codename of the HTC Droid Eris, a variant of the HTC Hero
 The brand name of the HTC Bravo